Oriental Institute of Science and Technology, Midnapore, established in 2006, is a college in Midnapore, in Paschim Medinipur district. It offers undergraduate, postgraduate courses in sciences. It also offers PhD degree under Vidyasagar University. It is affiliated to  Vidyasagar University.

Departments

Science

Biochemistry
Microbiology
Biotechnology

See also

References

External links
 http://www.oist.edu.in/

Universities and colleges in Paschim Medinipur district
Colleges affiliated to Vidyasagar University
Educational institutions established in 2006
2006 establishments in West Bengal